Běleč is a municipality and village in Kladno District in the Central Bohemian Region of the Czech Republic. It has about 300 inhabitants.

Geography
It lies in the Křivoklát Highlands. The Vůznice Stream springs here and flows across the municipality. Běleč lies in the Křivoklátsko Protected Landscape Area, part of the Vůznice National Nature Reserve is also situated in Běleč's territory.

History
The first written mention of Běleč is from 1352.

Sights
The main landmark of Běleč is the Church of Saint Nicholas. It was built in the Gothic style in the 14th century and rebuilt to its current appearance in 1903–1904. The church is surrounded by a cemetery and next to the cemetery stand a wooden bell tower from 1717.

Jenčov castle is a castle ruin located in the woods south of the village. It is freely accessible.

References

External links

Villages in Kladno District